Maplewood High School is a public high school in Cortland, Ohio, Trumbull County, Ohio  It is the only high school in the Maplewood Local Schools district.  Their mascot is the Rockets. and compete as a member of the Ohio High School Athletic Association and is a member of the Northeastern Athletic Conference. The district comprises three townships: Greene, Mecca, and Johnston, which are all within Trumbull County.

Athletics 
Maplewood High School currently offers:

 Baseball
 Basketball
 Bowling
 Cheerleading
 Cross country
 Golf
 Soccer
 Softball
 Track
 Volleyball

Ohio High School Athletic Association State Championships
 Boys Track and Field – 2000
 Boys Cross Country – 1972, 1997, 2002, 2003, 2005, 2014, 2015

Notes and references

External links
 District Website

High schools in Trumbull County, Ohio
Public high schools in Ohio